Luz ( Lūz) is the name of two places in the Bible.

Mentioned in Genesis
Luz is the ancient name of a royal Canaanite city, connected with Bethel (Genesis 28:19; 35:6). It is debated among scholars whether Luz and  Bethel represent the same town - the former the Canaanite name, and the latter the Hebrew name - or whether they were distinct places in close proximity to each other.  According to the King James Version (KJV), Luz was renamed by Jacob: "And he called the name of that place Bethel: but the name of that city was called Luz at the first.” (Genesis 28:19)

Mentioned in Book of Judges
A second city called Luz, founded by a man who came from the original Luz, is mentioned in Judges 1:23:  22And the house of Joseph, they also went up against Beth-el; and the LORD was with them. 23 And the house of Joseph sent to spy out Beth-el—now the name of the city beforetime was Luz. 24 And the watchers saw a man come forth out of the city, and they said unto him: 'Show us, we pray thee, the entrance into the city, and we will deal kindly with thee.' 25 And he showed them the entrance into the city, and they smote the city with the edge of the sword; but they let the man go and all his family. 26 And the man went into the land of the Hittites, and built a city, and called the name thereof Luz, which is the name thereof unto this day.

This second Luz is identified by some with Wazzani (or, Louaize), four miles northwest of Banias, in the Golan Heights.

References

Torah cities